Opportune Aymadji is a Chadian filmmaker and politician. She is a Patriotic Salvation Movement (MPS) Member of the National Assembly. In July 2015 she unsuccessfully attempted to become MPS Regional Secretary General for Logone Oriental.

Films
 Tatie Pouvait Vivre, 1995.

References

External links
 Entretien avec Aymadji Opportune

Year of birth missing (living people)
Living people
21st-century Chadian women politicians
21st-century Chadian politicians
Patriotic Salvation Movement politicians
Members of the National Assembly (Chad)
Chadian film directors
Chadian women film directors